Bartonella elizabethae, formerly known as Rochalimaea elizabethae, is a bacterium. As with other Bartonella species, it can cause disease in animals.

References

External links
Bartonella-Associated Infections – CDC
Bartonella species - List of Prokaryotic names with Standing in Nomenclature

Type strain of Bartonella elizabethae at BacDive -  the Bacterial Diversity Metadatabase

Bartonellaceae
Bacteria described in 1993